The Smrekovec Lodge is a mountain hostel on the southern slope of the Smrekovec Mountains in the Kamnik–Savinja Alps. The first lodge was built in 1933, but it was burned down during World War II. A new lodge was built in 1951, and expanded in 1976–77.

Starting points 
 3h: from the town of Črna na Koroškem,
 4½h: by car from the town of Šoštanj (26 km)
 3½h: by car from the town of Ljubno ob Savinji (16 km)

Neighbouring lodges  
 2½h: the Mozirje Lodge at Golte (1356 m)
 5h:  the Loka Lodge at Raduha (1534 m), passing the Travnik Lodge (1548 m) 
 2½h: the Andrej Lodge at Sleme (1086 m) 
 4½h: the Mount Ursula Lodge (1680 m)

Neighbouring mountains 
 ½h: Smrekovec (1577 m)
 2h: Komen (1684 m)

See also
 Slovenian Mountain Hiking Trail

References
 Slovenska planinska pot, Planinski vodnik, PZS, 2012, Milenko Arnejšek - Prle, Andraž Poljanec

External links
 Routes, Description & Photos
 Description

Mountain huts in Slovenia
Kamnik–Savinja Alps